Principles of Quantum Mechanics is a textbook by Ramamurti Shankar. The book has been through two editions. It is used in many college courses around the world.

Contents 
 Mathematical Introduction
 Review of Classical Mechanics
 All Is Not Well with Classical Mechanics
The Postulates - a General Discussion
 Simple Problems in One Dimension
 The Classical Limit
 The Harmonic Oscillator
 The Path Integral Formulation of Quantum Theory
 The Heisenberg Uncertainty Relations
 Systems with  Degrees of Freedom
 Symmetries and Their Consequences
 Rotational Invariance and Angular Momentum
 The Hydrogen Atom
Spin
 Addition of Angular Momenta
Variational and WKB Methods
 Time-Independent Perturbation Theory
 Time-Dependent Perturbation Theory
 Scattering Theory
 The Dirac Equation
 Path Integrals - II
 Appendix

Reviews 
Physics Bulletin said about the book, "No matter how gently one introduces students to the concept of Dirac’s bras and kets, many are turned off. Shankar attacks the problem head-on in the first chapter, and in a very informal style suggests that there is nothing to be frightened of". American Scientist called it "An excellent text … The postulates of quantum mechanics and the mathematical underpinnings are discussed in a clear, succinct manner".

See also 

 List of textbooks on classical and quantum mechanics

References 

Physics textbooks
Quantum mechanics